TJ Rovinka is a Slovak football team, based in the town of Rovinka. The club was founded in 1947.

Notable players
The following players had international caps for their respective countries. Players whose name is listed in bold represented their countries while playing for Rovinka.
Past (and present) players who are the subjects of Wikipedia articles can be found here.

 Siradji Sani

External links 
at futbalvregione.sk

References

Rovinka
Sport in Bratislava Region
Association football clubs established in 1947
1947 establishments in Slovakia